General Sir Charles Mansfield Clarke, 3rd Baronet,  (13 December 1839 – 22 April 1932) was a British Army officer who was Quartermaster-General to the Forces.

Military career
Educated at Eton College, Clarke was commissioned into the 57th Regiment of Foot in 1856.

He rose to become Commandant-General of the Colonial Forces of the Cape of Good Hope between 1880 and 1882. He held a series of administrative roles before becoming Commander-in-Chief of the Madras Army in 1893 (renamed "the Madras Command of the Indian Army" in 1895).

He was appointed to the command of the Sixth Army Corps in the Second Boer War in South Africa in December 1899.  He served as Quartermaster-General to the Forces from 1899 until 1903, during which he was promoted to general on 5 August 1902. The following year he became Governor and Commander-in-Chief of Malta, serving until he retired in 1907.

He succeeded to the title of 3rd Baronet Clarke of Dunham Lodge on 25 April 1899.

Family
In 1867 he married Gemma Cecilia Adams (who died in 1922) and they had three sons and three daughters. All his sons predeceased him and he was succeeded in the baronetcy by his nephew, Orme Bigland Clarke. In 1929 he married Constance Marion Warner.

Decorations 
Most Honourable Order of the Bath
 Companion, CB, 1879 after the Zulu War
 Knight Commander, KCB, 1896 Birthday Honours
 Knight Grand Cross, GCB, 29 November 1900, in recognition of services in connection with the Campaign in South Africa 1899–1900

Royal Victorian Order
 Knight Grand Cross, GCVO, 1903

References

 

|-
 

|-
 

|-

|-

1839 births
1932 deaths
British Army generals
Knights Grand Cross of the Order of the Bath
Knights Grand Cross of the Royal Victorian Order
57th Regiment of Foot officers
People of the Basuto Gun War
British military personnel of the Second Boer War
People educated at Eton College
Commanders-in-chief of Madras
Governors and Governors-General of Malta
Members of the Madras Legislative Council
Baronets in the Baronetage of the United Kingdom
Clarke baronets